The rivière à la Truite (in English: Trout river) is a tributary of the east bank of the Chaudière River, which flows northward to empty on the south bank of the St. Lawrence River.

Toponymy 
The toponym “rivière à la Truite” was made official on December 5, 1968, at the Commission de toponymie du Québec.

See also 

 List of rivers of Quebec

References 

Rivers of Chaudière-Appalaches
Beauce-Sartigan Regional County Municipality